Many foreign vehicles were used by the Wehrmacht of Nazi Germany during World War II. The German terms Beutepanzer (Loot Tank) and Beutefahrzeug (Loot Vehicle) were a general application for those vehicles. Whilst the majority were captured, vehicles produced by occupied countries are also included.

Designation format
The Wehrmacht re-designated captured vehicles with a structured formula. With some of the elements being optional and depending on the overall vehicle type or intended use, the following elements could be utilized:
Calibre (expressed in centimetres) 
The type of vehicle or main armament 
A model number (or name) adapted from the original designation
A year
A new series-related model number
A subvariant, indicated with a number after a "/"
A letter indicating the national origin of the vehicle

Captured vehicles
List of some captured equipment used by the German forces on the Russian front and others areas. Certain models were modified in factories or army workshops for infantry support, armed reconnaissance, antitank or antiaircraft units or as self-propelled guns or tank destroyers and many other operative or utility uses.

Captured tanks and tank destroyers

American M3 Lee
American M3 Stuart
American M4 Sherman
American M5 light tank
British Matilda tank - Pz. 748(e)
Czechoslovakian LT vz. 35 - Panzerkampfwagen 35(t)
Czechoslovakian LT vz. 38 - Panzerkampfwagen 38(t)
Czechoslovakian LT vz. 38 - 7.5 cm Pak 40/3 auf sfl. 38(t), Ausf H. or Marder III (Sd.Kfz. 138)
Czechoslovakian LT vz. 38 - 7.62 cm Pak 36(r) auf sfl. 38(t) or Marder III (Sd.Kfz. 139)
French Tracteur Blindé equipped with leFH 18/40/94 150 or sFH13
French Lorraine 37L - 7.5 cm Pak 40/1 auf Lorraine Schlepper(f) or Marder I (Sd.Kfz. 135)
French Lorraine 37L - 15 cm sFH 13/1 auf Lorraine Schlepper(f) (Sd.Kfz. 135/1)
French Lorraine 37L - 10.5 cm leFH 18/4 auf Lorraine Schlepper(f) -105 mm
French Renault FT - Pz. 730(f)
French Renault R35 - Pz. 35R 731(f)
French Hotchkiss H35 - Pz. 35H 734(f)
French Hotchkiss H39 - Pz. 38H 735(f)
French Hotchkiss H39 - 7.5 cm Pak 40 auf Geschützwagen 39H(f)
French Hotchkiss H39 - 10.5 cm leFH18(Sf) auf Geschützwagen 39H(f)
French Hotchkiss H39 - Artillerieschlepper 38H(f)
French Hotchkiss H35 - Panzerkampfwagen 35H(f) mit 28/32 cm Wurfrahmen
French Hotchkiss H39 - Panzerbeobachtungswagen 38H(f)
French Char D1 - Pz. D1 732(f)
French Char D2 - Pz. D2 733(f)
French FCM 36 - Pz. FCM 737(f)
French FCM 36 - 7.5 cm Pak 40 auf Geschützwagen FCM(f)
French Somua S35 - Pz. 35S 739(f)
French Char B1 - Pz. B-2 740(f)
Italian Fiat M15/42
Italian Fiat Semovente 75/18 self-propelled gun/tank destroyer - Sturmgeschütz M42 mit 75/18 850(i)
Italian Fiat Semovente 75/34 self-propelled gun/tank destroyer - Sturmgeschütz M42 mit 75/34 851(i)
Italian Fiat Semovente 105/25 self-propelled gun/tank destroyer - Sturmgeschütz M43 mit 105/25 853(i)
Soviet T-26 - Pz. 740(r)
Soviet T-26 - PZ-740(r) and (7.5 cm Pak 97/38(f)
Soviet BT-5 - Pz. 742(r)
Soviet BT-7
Soviet T20 tankette
Soviet T-28
Soviet T-37
Soviet T-40
Soviet T-60
Soviet T-70
Soviet T-34 - Pz. 747(r)
Soviet KV-1 - Pz. 753(r)
Soviet KV-1 - PZ-750(r) mit 7.5 cm KwK 40 L/43
Soviet KV-2
Soviet IS-2

Captured armoured cars and half-tracks
American M3 Scout Car
American M8 Greyhound - Panzerspähwagen M8(a)
British Marmon-Herrington Armoured Car
British Marmon-Herrington Humber
British Daimler Dingo Mk 1  - Le. Pz.Sp.Wg. Mk l 202(e)
British AEC Dorchester Armoured Bus
British Universal Carrier - Gepanzerter Maschinengewehrträger Bren 731(e)
British Universal Carrier - Gep. MG-Träger Br 731(e) modified with 20 mm Flak 38
British Universal Carrier - 8.8 cm Raketenpanzerbüchse 43 (with 88 mm Rockets)
British Universal Carrier - Gep. MG-Träger Br 731(e) mit 3.7 cm PaK 35/36
Dutch DAF M39 - Pz.Sp.Wg. L202(h)
Dutch DAF M36
French Renault ZT / AMR 35 - Pz.Sp.Wg. ZT 702(f)
French Lorraine S - Grosser Funk und Beobachtungpanzer auf Lorraine S(f)
French AMD Panhard 178 - Pz.Sph. 204(f)
French AMD Panhard 178 - Pz.Sph. 204(f) mit KwK 38 L/42
French Unic P107 - Leichter Zugkraftwagen U304(f)
French Unic P107 - Leichter Schützenpanzerwagen U304(f)
French Somua MCG/MCL - Le.Zgkw. S307(f)
French Somua MCG/MCL - Mittlerer gepanzerter Zugkraftwagen S307/303(f)
French Somua MCG/MCL - Mittlerer Schützenpanzerwagen S307/303(f)
French Somua MCG/MCL - SPW S307/303(f) mit Reihenwerfer
French Somua MCG/MCL - 7.5 cm Pak 40 auf m SPW S307/303(f)
French Somua MCG/MCL - 8 cm R-Vielfachwerfer auf m.gep.Zgkw. S307/303(f)
French Somua MCG/MCL - 15 cm Panzerwerfer 42 auf m.gep Zgkw. S307/303(f) Nebelwerfer 41
French Renault UE - Infanterieschlepper UE 630(f)
French Renault UE - 3.7 cm Pak 36(Sf) auf Infanterieschlepper UE 630(f)
French Renault UE - 28/32 cm Wurfrahmen(Sf) auf Infanterieschlepper UE 630(f)
Italian Autoblindo AB41 - Panzerspähwagen AB41 201(i)
Soviet FAI
Soviet BA-20 - Panzerspähwagen BA202(r)
Soviet BA-6
Soviet BA-10 - Panzerspähwagen BA203(r)
Soviet BA-27
Soviet BA-64 modified with 37 mm Pak 35/36 Cannon
Spanish AAC1937 (captured while in French service)
Swedish Landsverk 180/181 (captured while in Danish service)

See also 
 German designations of foreign artillery in World War II
 German designations of foreign firearms in World War II

References

Foreign vehicles
Foreign vehicles used by Nazi Germany in World War II
World War II military vehicles of Germany
Foreign vehicles used by Nazi Germany in World War II
Foreign vehicles used by Nazi Germany in World War II